The ice dance competition of the 2010 Winter Olympics was held at the Pacific Coliseum in Vancouver, British Columbia, Canada. The event was held on February 19 (compulsory dance), 21 (original dance), and 22 (free dance), 2010.

Competition notes
The compulsory dance was held on February 19. The compulsory dance was the Tango Romantica. The original dance was held on February 21. The free dance was held on February 22, 2010.

Tessa Virtue and Scott Moir became the first ice dancers from Canada and North America to win an Olympic gold medal. They became the first former World Junior Ice dance champions to win the Olympics, and the first ice dance team to win the Olympic gold on home ice. They were also the first ice dancers to win gold on their Olympic debut since the inaugural Olympic ice dance event in 1976 and the youngest ice dance Olympic champions at 20 and 22 years of age. Isabelle Delobel competed at the Olympics with partner Olivier Schoenfelder just four-and-a-half months after giving birth.

Results

Compulsory dance

Original dance

Free dance

Overall

Judges and officials
Referee:
 Halina Gordon-Poltorak

Technical Controller:
 Katalin Alpern

Technical Specialist:
 Marika Humphreys-Baranova

Assistant Technical Specialist:
 Francesca Fermi

Judges (CD):
 Irina Nechkina
 Charles Cyr
 Alla Shekhovtsova
 Laimute Krauziene
 Ulf Denzer
 Liudmila Mikhailovskaya
 Isabella Micheli
 Jodi Abbott
 Mayumi Kato

Judges (OD):
 Liudmila Mikhailovskaya
 Irina Nechkina
 Laimute Krauziene
 Laurent Carriere
 Akos Pethes
 Jodi Abbott
 Hilary Selby
 Albert Zaydman
 Alla Shekhovtsova

Judges (FD):
 Albert Zaydman
 Liudmila Mikhailovskaya
 Ulf Denzer
 Laurent Carriere
 Isabella Micheli
 Mayumi Kato
 Hilary Selby
 Akos Pethes
 Irina Nechkina

References

External links
 Vancouver 2010: Figure Skating 
 2010 Winter Olympics results: Ice Dance (compulsory dance), from https://web.archive.org/web/20100222080013/http://www.vancouver2010.com/ retrieved 2010-02-21.
 2010 Winter Olympics results: Ice Dance (original dance), from https://web.archive.org/web/20100222080013/http://www.vancouver2010.com/ retrieved 2010-02-21.
 2010 Winter Olympics results: Ice Dance (free dance), from https://web.archive.org/web/20100222080013/http://www.vancouver2010.com/ retrieved 2010-02-21.

Ice dance
2010
2010 in figure skating
Mixed events at the 2010 Winter Olympics